The 1983 Minnesota Golden Gophers football team represented the University of Minnesota in the 1983 NCAA Division I-A football season. In their fifth and final year under head coach Joe Salem, the Golden Gophers compiled a 1–10 record and were outscored by their opponents by a combined total of 518 to 181.
 
Offensive tackle Randy Rasmussen received the team's Most Valuable Player award, while tight end Jay Carroll was named offensive MVP, and linebacker Peter Najarian was named the defensive MVP. Najarian was named All-Big Ten second team.  Najarian and split end Fred Hartwig were named Academic All-Big Ten.

Total attendance for the season was 243,674, which averaged to 48,734. The season high for attendance was against Wisconsin, although the game against Nebraska drew only two people less.

Schedule

Roster
C Randy Rasmussen

References

Minnesota
Minnesota Golden Gophers football seasons
Minnesota Golden Gophers football